Season three of HaDugmaniot aired from February 2, 2008 to April 22, 2008 on Channel 10 and saw 12 girls compete for the title of the new Israeli Top Model. Once again hosted by Galit Gutman, the season contained 14 episodes (including a recap and a best-of episode).

In Episode 1, 18 semifinalists were invited to the models' house in Tel Aviv where at the end of the Episode the 12 finalists were determined when they received a necklace which indicated their permission to be in the competition. After a girl was sent home, she had to return this necklace.

The international destination of the season was once again Paris, to where Gutman already took the girls from Season 1. After the original top 3 was chosen, the nine prior eliminated girls received another chance to compete in the final when all of them were brought back in Episode 12. At the end of that episode, all twelve girls voted for which girl they wanted to be in the final. Tslil Sela, previously eliminated by her fellow competitors, then received the most votes. The wildcard from the judges was given to Rita Os, originally eliminated in sixth place in front of the Eiffel Tower.

The two joined Ella Mashkautzen, Sasha Taptikov and Natali Dadon in the live final where the audience voted Ella the winner of the season.

Contestants

(ages stated are at start of contest)

Semi-finalists

Finalists

Judges
 Galit Gutman
 Miki Buganim
 Elimor Zilberman
 Seffi Shakked
 Stella Amar

Summaries

Call-out order

 The contestant was eliminated
 The contestant was part of a non-elimination bottom two
 The contestant was eliminated outside of judging panel
 The contestant won the competition

Challenges

Episode 1 photo shoots: Polaroids; Metallic style outfit in group (casting)
Episode 2 photo shoot: Party animals in a nightclub
Episode 3 photo shoot: Underwater beauty shots with a hat
Episode 4 photo shoot: Car accident scenes
Episode 5 runway: In Lilach Krystal's design at the firehouse
Episode 6 commercial: Anti-Anorexia
Episode 7 photo shoot: Bikinis on the beach; Gothic brides
Episode 8 photo shoot: Detained at the airport
Episode 10 challenge & photo shoot: Go-see; Fashion burglars
Episode 11 challenge: Casting at Next Model Management in Paris
Episode 13 motion editorial & photo shoot: Action soldiers; Posing nude with mannequins

Post–careers

Alina Raifa signed with Yuli Models. She has taken a couple of test shots and shooting print work for Shenkar,... She has walked in the fashion shows for Shenkar June 2011, Triumph Fall-Winter 2011-2012,... She retired from modeling in 2013.
Limor Eliyahu signed with Touch Models.
Liliana Sotnikov signed with Yuli Models. She has taken a couple of test shots and shooting print works for Dark Margot, Eyal Makeup College, Kelly Dolev Makeup, Il Makiage Makeup, Sharon Maimon,... She retired from modeling in 2018.
Karin Cohen has been shooting print works and commercials for Zippo Perfume, Josef Shoes, Shlomit Azrad, Fashion Club, Expose Swimwear, H&O Swimwear, Quick Fix by Secret YK,... She was voted the most on The Sexy Israeli Contest 2010 held by Mako website. Beside modeling, Cohen appeared in several reality-show and in a guest role of the TV series like Wipeout Israel, Date BaHashekha, Ramzor, Televizia MeHa'Atid, Grutarally - Shuvam Shel 'Yeled Ochel MePach',...
Katya Gur signed with Look Models and Yuli Models. She has taken a couple of test shots, before retired from modeling in 2013.
Tslil Sela signed with Yuli Models and Roberto Models Agency. She has taken a couple of test shots and walked in the fashion shows for Balagan Fashion. She has been shooting print works and commercials for Status Fashion, Sanyang Motor, Rina Bahir Wedding, Walla Fashion Fall 2011, Il Makiage Makeup, Castro,... Sela also appeared on the Bride Of the World 2012 pageant in Macau. Beside modeling, she appeared in the music videos "Shagaat/Tarefet" by Lior Narkis and in a guest role in an episodes of Savri Maranan. She retired from modeling in 2014.
Natali Dadon signed with Yuli Models. She has taken a couple of test shots, participated in several commercials and walked in the fashion shows for Shenkar July 2008, Balagan Fashion,... She has also appeared on the cover and editorials for Moto Magazine, Pnai Plus, Go Style Magazine, LaIsha, Zmanim Yedioth Magazine,... Beside modeling, Dadon appeared in the music videos "Kochevet" by Eve & Lear and several reality-show like Lila Bakhif, Plastic Dreams, Survivor: VIP, MTV Israel Music Awards with Jason Danino-Holt, Big Brother VIP, The Daily Report,... 
Rita Os signed with Yuli Models. She has taken a couple of test shots and shooting print works for Ido Politi, Sigal Dekel Summer 2008, Karni Underwear Summer 2008,... Beside modelling, Os is also appeared in a guest role in an episodes of the TV sitcom The Foxes. She retired from modeling in 2013.
Sasha Taptikov signed with Yuli Models and Ford Models in Paris. She has taken a couple of test shots and walked in the fashion show of Balagan Fashion. She has been shooting print works and commercials for Lilach Crystal, Michel Mercier's Summer 2008, Il Makiage Makeup, Daliti's Winter catalog,... She retired from modeling in 2013.
Ella Mashkautzen collected her prizes and signed with Yuli Models. She is also signed with Ice Models in Milan, Premier Model Management in London, Elite Model Management in Miami and Take 3 Talent Agency, Product Model Management, Q Model Management & Silent Models in New York City. She has taken a couple of test shots and walked in the fashion shows for Balagan Fashion, Tovaleh & Naama Hassin, Shenkar,... Mashkautzen has several magazine covers and editorials for Signon-Maariv Magazine, i-D, Shamenet Magazine, Rendez-Vous de la Mode, Bergen Magazine, Gosee Magazine, Crystals Magazine, Edge Magazine, Malvie French, Cosmopolitan Russia,... She is also been shooting print works for Yosef Peretz, FIX Underwear, Sugar Daddy's Summer 2009, Karen Mizrahi, Nero Giardini Fall-Winter 2010-2011, Renuar Winter 2012, Lafayette Italy, Rubacuori Luxury Spring-Summer 2013, Tide, Gap Inc., Target, Asprey, Pampers,... Beside modeling, she is also pursuing a music career as a DJ and appeared in the music videos "Más y Más" by Draco Rosa ft. Ricky Martin.

Ratings

References

External links 
Official website of HaDugmaniyot (season 3) (Hebrew) (archive at the Wayback Machine)

2008 Israeli television seasons
Israeli reality television series
HaDugmaniot